Joker: Last Laugh is a crossover storyline published by DC Comics in 2001.

Summary
While locked up in the Slab penitentiary, the Joker finds out that he is suffering from a terminal brain tumor. Determined to go out with a bang, he causes a riot in the Slab, and in the ensuing chaos, modifies the chemicals used by the prison to suppress its metahuman inmates into his Joker venom, and manages to "jokerize" the other inmates, making them insane and changing their appearance, giving them white skin, red lips, green hair, and a wide smile. The Black Canary, Nightwing, and Batman move in to put down the riot, while Dinah Laurel Lance and Shilo Norman are trapped inside. The Joker prompts Black Mass to suck the prison into a black hole while he and the other villains escape. The Blue Beetle narrowly rescues the Black Canary, Batman, and Nightwing, while Dinah and Shilo are not so lucky. Barbara Gordon feels remorseful for being absent on a date with Dick Grayson (Nightwing) while the riot first broke out and begins to wish that she could kill the Joker for the pain that he has caused in her life.

Chaos soon spreads throughout the entire Earth and U.S. President Lex Luthor declares war on the Joker. While the JLA searches for him, the Joker hides out on Easter Island and sends his minions to capture Harley Quinn so he can impregnate her and produce an heir. Harley is eventually rescued by the Spoiler, Batgirl, and Power Girl.

Meanwhile, the Joker grows disgruntled at the lack of creativity behind his minions' havoc, realizing that "every other crisis" involves red skies and crazy weather. With the assistance of Stormfront and Mr. 104, the Joker poisons the atmosphere and creates "crazy rain", spreading his laughing toxin across the world. His next plan is the assassination of President Luthor.

While the "Jokerized" villains are being rounded up, Kirk Langstrom discovers that the venom they are affected with is also deadly and works to produce an antidote with the reluctant help of Harley Quinn. The Black Canary also discovers that the Joker's CAT scans were modified and that the doctors lied to him about his impending death in the hope that it would cause him to lead a more sane life.

Inside the Slab, Shilo and Dinah are struggling to find a way to get themselves and the prison back to Earth. They initially try to find Black Mass to reverse the gravity well with the help of Mister Mind; however, Dinah accidentally shoots Black Mass during a run-in with the Maneaters. They eventually resort to killing Multi-Man over and over until he is able to reanimate Black Mass, who then sends them back to Earth.

The Huntress is sent to Arkham Asylum to find Robin, who disappeared into the building and stopped sending out reports. After encountering Killer Croc, she finds what appears to be Robin's shredded outfit. Nightwing, enraged over Robin's death, goes to face the Joker, who is now holed up in Gotham Cathedral with one of his Jokerized metahumans placing a shield around the area. He can let in only who he wants to and decides to have fun with Nightwing. Mercilessly taunting him, Dick beats him to death until the Batman Family, Robin included, arrives on the scene, much to Nightwing's surprise. The Joker's heart is restarted and he is returned to prison. But Dick is distraught; he has crossed the line, and simply walks out on his friends.

Back at the Slab (now located on an ice floe), the Joker is placed in a new cell with no entrances or exits. Shilo Norman remarks that the only way to punish a performer is to take away his audience.

Issues

Core storyline
Joker: Last Laugh Secret Files and Origins #1
Joker: Last Laugh #1
Joker: Last Laugh #2
Joker: Last Laugh #3
Joker: Last Laugh #4
Joker: Last Laugh #5
Joker: Last Laugh #6

Tie-in issues
Action Comics #784
Adventures of Superman #597
Azrael: Agent of the Bat #83
Batgirl (vol. 2) #21
Batman #596
Batman: Gotham Knights #22
Birds of Prey #36
Detective Comics #763
Flash (vol. 2) #179
Green Lantern (vol. 3) #143
Harley Quinn #13
Impulse #79
JLA #59
JSA #29
Nightwing (vol. 2) #62
Orion #19
Robin (vol. 4) #95
Spectre (vol. 4) #10
Superboy (vol. 4) #93
Supergirl (vol. 4) #63
Superman (vol. 2) #175
Superman: The Man of Steel #119
Titans #34
Wonder Woman (vol. 2) #175
Young Justice #38

See also
 List of Batman comics
 Publication history of DC Comics crossover events

References

Joker (character) titles